This article is a catalog of actresses and models who have appeared on the cover of Harper's Bazaar magazine, starting in 1945.

1940s

1945

1946

1947

1948

1949

1950s

1950

1951

1952

1953

1954

1955

1956

1957

1958

1959

1960s

1960

1961

1962

1963

1964

1965

1966

1967

1968

1969

1970s

1970

1971

1972

1973

1974

1975

1976

1977

1978

1979

1980s

1980

1981

1982

1983

1984

1985

1986

1987

1988

1989

1990s

1990

1991

1992

1993

1994

1995

1996

1997

1998

1999

2000s

2000

2001

2002

2003

2004

2005

2006

2007

2008

2009

2010s

2010

2011

2012

2013

2014

2015

2016

2017

2018

2019

2020s

2020

2021

2022

2023

See also

 List of Vogue (US) cover models

External links 
 https://web.archive.org/web/20111228080044/http://www.harpersbazaar.com/
 Harper's Bazaar US cover archive

US